The Armoured Engineer Reconnaissance Vehicle (AERV) is an Indian military engineering vehicle developed by Defence Research and Development Organisation (DRDO) in coordination with C-TEC, as per General Staff Qualitative Requirements (GSQRs) of the Indian Army for enabling the combat engineers to conduct recce operations.

Development 
AERV is manufactured by Ordnance Factory Medak, now comes under Armoured Vehicles Nigam Limited (AVANI). The AERV is based on BMP-2 Sarath's hull (license produced variant of Russian BMP-2) and is designed to carry out terrestrial and riverbed survey to facilitate construction of assault bridges across water obstacles in both offensive and defensive operations in plains, desert and riverine terrain.  It has no gun and is fitted with specialized equipment, including an echo-sounder, a water current meter, a laser range finder and GPS. On the left rear of the hull, a marking system with 40 rods is fitted.

AERV is developed by Vehicle Research and Development Establishment (VRDE) and Research & Development Establishment (Engineers). While Bharat Electronics is manufacturing 14 major electronics and sensors.

Operational history 
On 22 December 2021, Indian Army Corps of Engineers formally inducted AERV in Pune. Indian Army ordered 53 units of AERV that upon induction will be deployed on the Western front.

References

External links
 https://web.archive.org/web/20131116233034/http://www.bharat-rakshak.com/LAND-FORCES/Army/Galleries/Mod/Logistics/Engineers/0616.jpg.html
 https://web.archive.org/web/20160304061033/http://www.drdo.gov.in/drdo/Hindi/dpi/combat.htm
 http://articles.janes.com/articles/Janes-Military-Vehicles-and-Logistics/Armoured-Engineer-Reconnaissance-Vehicle-AERV-India.html

Military vehicles of India
Military engineering vehicles